The Ferrara Marathon is an annual marathon competition hosted by the city of Ferrara, Italy. The inaugural year was 1979. The race was held in nearby Vigarano Mainarda for 1999 and earlier.

Past winners
Key:

References

Ferrara Marathon. Association of Road Racing Statisticians (2009-03-27). Retrieved on 2010-07-22.

External links
Official website

Marathons in Italy
Ferrara
1979 establishments in Italy
Recurring sporting events established in 1979
Spring (season) events in Italy